In mathematics, Favard's theorem, also called the Shohat–Favard theorem,  states that a sequence of  polynomials satisfying a suitable 3-term recurrence relation  is a sequence of orthogonal polynomials.

Statement
Suppose that  y0 = 1, y1, ... is a sequence of polynomials where yn has degree n. If this is a sequence of orthogonal polynomials for some positive weight function then it satisfies a 3-term recurrence relation. Favard's theorem is roughly a converse of this, and states that if these polynomials satisfy a 3-term recurrence relation of the form

for some numbers cn and dn,
then the polynomials yn form an orthogonal sequence for some linear functional Λ with Λ(1)=1; in other words Λ(ymyn) = 0 if m ≠ n.

The linear functional Λ is unique, and is given by Λ(1) = 1, Λ(yn) = 0 if n > 0.

The functional Λ satisfies  Λ(y) = dn Λ(y), which implies that  Λ is positive definite if (and only if) the numbers cn are real and the numbers dn are positive.

See also 
 Jacobi operator

References
 Reprinted by Dover 2011, 

 

Orthogonal polynomials
Theorems in approximation theory